The Lyell Readership in Bibliography is an endowed annual lecture series given at Oxford University. Instituted in 1952 by a bequest from the solicitor, book collector and bibliographer James Patrick Ronaldson Lyell (1871–1948), the series has continued down to the present day. Together with the Panizzi Lectures at the British Library and the Sandars Lectures at Cambridge University, it is considered one of the major British bibliographical lecture series.

Lectures 
 1952–1953 Neil Ripley Ker: English Manuscripts in the Century after the Norman Conquest
 1954–1955 Walter Wilson Greg: Some Aspects and Problems of London Publishing between 1550 and 1650
 1956–1957 Stanley Arthur Morison: Aspects of Authority and Freedom in Relation to Greco–Latin Script, Inscription, and Type
 1959–1960 Fredson T. Bowers: Bibliography and Textual Criticism
 1960–1961 Henry Graham Pollard: The Medieval Book Trade in Oxford
 1961–1962 Philip Hofer: The Artist and the Book in France
 1962–1963 A.N.L. Munby: Three Nineteenth-Century Collectors of Manuscripts
 1963–1964 Jacques Guignard: L'Art de le Reliure en France et l'Action des Bibliophiles: Quelques Aspects de la Question
 1964–1965 William Beattie: Some Aspects of the History of the Advocates' Library
 1965–1966 Simon Harcourt Nowell-Smith: International Copyright Law and the Publisher in the Reign of Queen Victoria
 1966–1967 Anthony Ian Doyle: Some English Scribes and Scriptoria of the Later Middle Ages
 1967–1968 Harry Graham Carter: A View of Early Typography up to about 1600
 1968–1969 : The Labours of Hercules: Some Observations on the History of Erasmus's Opera Omnia
 1969–1970 William Burton Todd: Scholarly Texts: Variable Techniques and Designs
 1970–1971 Otto Ernst Pächt: The Art of Drawing within the Realm of Medieval Illumination
 1971–1972 Wytze Hellinga: The Bibliography of Early Printing in the Low Countries between 1767 and 1874
 1972–1973 André Masson: Le Catalogue Figuratif: A Pictorial Guide to the Contents of European Libraries from the Fifteenth to the Eighteenth Century
 1973–1974 Alan W. Tyson: Beethoven: Studies in the Genesis of his Music 1803–9
 1974–1975 T.A.M. Bishop: The Script of Corbie
 1975–1976 David F. Foxon: Pope and the Early Eighteenth-Century Book Trade
 1976–1977 T. Julian Brown: The Insular System of Scripts, c.600–c.850
 1977–1978 Mme Jeanne Veyrin-Forrer: La Famille Fournier et la Fonderie Typographique en France au XVIIIe Siècle
 1978–1979 Howard Millar Nixon: English Decorated Bookbindings
 1979–1980 Monsignor José Ruysschaert: Recherches Vaticanes sur la Miniature Italienne du Quinzième Siecle
 1980–1981 Ian Gilbert Philip: The Bodleian Library in the Seventeenth and Eighteenth Centuries
 1981–1982 Berthold Wolpe: The Quest for Beauchesne: Contributions to the History of Elizabethan Calligraphy and Print-Making
 1982–1983 Jonathan J.G. Alexander: Creation and Transmission: Methods of Work of Manuscript Illuminators in the Middle Ages
 1983–1984 Robert Shackleton: The Bibliographical History of Montesquieu
 1984–1985 Gordon Norton Ray: The Art Deco Book in France
 1985–1986 Edwin Wolf: Books, Bookmen, and Booksellers in Colonial Philadelphia
 1986–1987 Mary Pollard: Dublin Trade in Books 1550 to 1800
 1987–1988 D.F. McKenzie: Bibliography and History: Seventeenth-Century England
 1988–1989 Donald H. Reiman: The Study of Modern Manuscripts: Public, Confidential, and Private
 1989–1990 Elizabeth L. Eisenstein: Grub Street Abroad: Aspects of the French Cosmopolitan Press from the Age of Louis XIV to the French Revolution
 1990–1991 A.R.A. Hobson: Two Renaissance Book-Collectors: Jean Grolier and Diego Hurtado de Mendoza, Their Libraries and Bookbindings
 1991–1992 R.H. Rouse: Book-Producers and Pook-Production in Paris: Family, Shop, and Neighbourhood on the Rue Neuve Notre-Dame, 1200–1500
 1992–1993 Bernhard Fabian: English Authors and German Publishers in the Eighteenth Century
 1993–1994 Joseph Burney Trapp: Illustrations of Petrarch from the Fourteenth to the Sixteenth Century
 1994–1995 Henri-Jean Martin: Du Manuscrit au Livre Imprimé: Mise en Page et Mise en Texte des Textes Littéraires Français de la Fin due XVe Siècle au Milieu du XVIIe Siècle
 1995–1996 Peter Beal: In Praise of Scribes: Manuscripts and Their Makers in Seventeenth-Century England
 1996–1997 Robert Darnton: Policing Literature in Eighteenth-Century Paris
 1998–1999 Malcolm B. Parkes: Their Hands before Our Eyes: A Closer Look at Scribes
 1999–2000 David McKitterick: Set in Print: The Fortunes of an Idea, c.1450–1800
 2000–2001 Rodney Malcolm Thomson: Books and Learning in Twelfth-Century England: The Ending of 'Alter Orbis'
 2001–2002 Bruce Bryning Redford: Designing the Life of Johnson
 2002–2003 Nigel G. Wilson: The World of Books in Byzantium
 2003–2004 Kathleen L. Scott: Suppleatur per Ymaginacionem: Exceptional Images in Later Medieval English Manuscripts
 2004–2005 : Literary Life and Book-Market in Germany under the Swastika 1933–1945
 2005–2006 Leslie Howsam: Historical Knowledge and British Publishers, 1850–1950: Discipline and Narrative
 2006–2007 Mirella Ferrari: The Scriptorium and Library of Bobbio
 2007–2008 Kristian Jensen: Collecting Incunabula: Enlightenment, Revolution, and the Market — Rediscovering and Re-Creating the Earliest Printed Books in the Eighteenth Century
 2008–2009 Christopher F.R. de Hamel: Fragments in Book Bindings
 2009–2010 Ian Maclean: The Business of Scholarship: The Trade in Latin Books in the Age of Confessions, 1560–1630
 2010–2011 David Parker: Describing the New Testament
 2011–2012 Lukas Erne: Shakespeare and the Book Trade
 2012–2013 Richard Beadle: Late Medieval English Autograph Writings and Their Uses
 2013–2014 H.R. Woudhuysen: 'Almost Identical': Copying Books in England, 1600–1900
 2014–2015 Michael Suarez, : The Reach of Bibliography
 2015–2016 Teresa Webber: Public Reading and its Books: Monastic Ideals and Practice in England c. 1000–c. 1300
 2016–2017 Paul Nelles: The Vatican Library in the Counter-Reformation
 2017–2018 David Pearson: Book Ownership in Stuart England
 2018–2019 Richard Sharpe: Libraries and Books in Medieval England: The Role of Libraries in a Changing Book Economy (recordings here)
 2019–2020 Marc Smith Writing models from manuscript to print: France, England and Europe, c.1400–1800 (recordings here)
 2020–2021 Paul Needham: The Genesis, Life, and Afterlife of the Gutenberg Bible (link to recorded versions here) 
 2021–2022 Susan Rankin: From Memory to Written Record: English Liturgical Books and Musical Notations, 900–1150 (first lecture available here)

See also
 E. A. Lowe Lectures
 McKenzie Lectures
 Panizzi Lectures
 Sandars Lectures

References

Bibliography
History of books
Lecture series at the University of Oxford
Palaeography
Textual criticism
Textual scholarship